Jean Xceron (1890–1967) was an American abstract painter of Greek origin.  He immigrated to the United States in 1904 and studied at the Corcoran School of Art. He worked at the Guggenheim Museum as a security guard for 28 years from 1939 to his death. He is described as a "pioneer of non-objective painting" by the Smithsonian Archives of American Art. His works are in the collections of the Smithsonian American Art Museum and the Hirshhorn Museum and Sculpture Garden.

References

External links 
 
 Jean Xceron – Smithsonian American Art Museum

1890 births
1967 deaths
20th-century American painters
20th-century male artists
American male painters
Greek emigrants to the United States
Corcoran School of the Arts and Design alumni
Security guards
Federal Art Project artists
19th-century Greek Americans
19th-century Greek painters
20th-century Greek painters
Artists from Pittsburgh
People from Megalopoli, Greece